Patrick Irwin (1839 - February 6, 1910) was an Irish - American soldier who received a Medal of Honor for his action in the Union Army during the American Civil War. Irwin served as a First Sergeant in Company H of the 14th Michigan Volunteer Infantry Regiment. He earned his medal for actions during the Battle of Jonesboro, Georgia on September 1, 1864. Following his death in 1910, Irwin was interred in St. Thomas Cemetery.

Medal of Honor Citation 
In a charge by the 14th Michigan Infantry against the entrenched enemy was the first man over the line of works of the enemy, and demanded and received the surrender of Confederate Gen. Daviel Govan and his command.

Date Issued: April 28, 1896

References 

American Civil War recipients of the Medal of Honor
1839 births
1910 deaths
Irish emigrants to the United States
Union Army soldiers